GJA may refer to:
 Ghana Journalists Association
 Globe Jet, a defunct Lebanese airline
 Golden Joystick Awards
 Guanaja Airport, in Honduras
 Gojra railway station, in Pakistan
 Gap junction alpha protein, see Gap junction protein